Neutron economy is defined as the ratio of an adjoint weighted average of the excess neutron production divided by an adjoint weighted average of the fission production.

The distribution of neutron energies in a nuclear reactor differs from the fission neutron spectrum due to the slowing down of neutrons in elastic and inelastic collisions with fuel, coolant and construction material. Neutrons slow down in elastic and inelastic collisions, until they are absorbed via Neutron capture or lost by leakage. Neutron economy is the balanced account, in a reactor, of the neutrons created and the neutrons lost through absorption by non-fuel elements, resonance absorption by fuel, and leakage while fast and thermal energy ranges.

Heavy water is an extremely efficient moderator. As a result, reactors using heavy water, such as the CANDU, also have a high neutron economy.

The quantity that indicates how much the neutron economy is out of balance is given the term reactivity. If a reactor is exactly critical—that is, the neutron production is exactly equal to neutron destruction—the reactivity is zero. If the reactivity is positive, the reactor is supercritical. If the reactivity is negative, the reactor is subcritical.

The term "neutron economy" is used not just for the instantaneous reactivity of a reactor, but also to describe the overall efficiency of a nuclear reactor design.

See also
Dollar (reactivity)
Breeder reactor

References

Economy
Nuclear technology